The Apostolic Vicariate of San Ramón is a Latin Church apostolic vicariate of the Catholic Church located in the episcopal see of San Ramón in Peru.

History
 March 2, 1956: Established as Apostolic Vicariate of San Ramón from the suppressed Vicariate Apostolic of Ucayali (along with two other vicariates: Vicariate Apostolic of Pucallpa and Vicariate Apostolic of Requena).

Bishops
 Vicar Apostolics of San Ramon
 Bishop León Buenaventura de Uriarte Bengoa, O.F.M. (March 2, 1956 – January 19, 1970)
 Bishop Luis María Blas Maestu Ojanguren, O.F.M. (March 11, 1971 – January 24, 1987)
 Bishop Julio Ojeda Pascual, O.F.M. (March 30, 1987 – March 11, 2003)
 Bishop Anton Žerdín Bukovec, O.F.M. (March 11, 2003 – present)

Coadjutor Vicar Apostolic
Anton (Gerardo Antonio) Žerdín Bukovec, O.F.M. (2002-2003)

References

External links
 GCatholic.org
 Catholic Hierarchy 

Apostolic vicariates
Roman Catholic dioceses in Peru
Christian organizations established in 1956
1956 establishments in Peru
Roman Catholic dioceses and prelatures established in the 20th century